Murphy Farms Number 1 is located in the Town of Egg Harbor, Wisconsin.

History
Frank E. Murphy was a prominent philanthropist, businessman and politician in Green Bay, Wisconsin. During the early 20th Century, he began developing a pair of farms, with his nephew, Elbridge.

Originally, the Murphys bred and showcased Holstein Friesian cattle at the farm. Frank Murphy would later focus on Dairy and fruit farming.

The farm was added to the State Register of Historic Places in 2011 and to the National Register of Historic Places the following year.

References

Farms on the National Register of Historic Places in Wisconsin
National Register of Historic Places in Door County, Wisconsin
Dairy buildings in the United States
Colonial Revival architecture in Wisconsin